Mark Weigle (born 1967 in Annandale, Minnesota) is an American singer/songwriter. At the 2003 Outmusic Awards, Weigle received five Outmusic nominations and won in three categories, including: "Outsong of the Year", "Outstanding New Recording", and "Outstanding Producer".

His 1998 debut album, The Truth Is, included low-key compositions in a country/folk style, such as "The Two Cowboy Waltz".  His 2003 album, Different and the Same, included adaptations of others' songs, such as "867-5309/Jenny" (Weigle's version changed the name and gender of the song's subject to "867-5309/Jimmy"), and "Love Song To A Stranger".

Discography
 1998 - The Truth Is
 2000 - All That Matters
 2002 - Out of The Loop
 2003 - Different and the Same
 2005 - SoulSex (Wrestling the Angel/Versatile)
 2007 - Mark Weigle

Collaborations

In 2004, Weigle sang a duet with indie singer-songwriter Skott Freedman on the Magnetic Fields' song "Papa Was a Rodeo". The version appears on Freedman's 2004 release, Judge a Book.

References

External links
 2000 Folk Plus interview transcript
 2001 San Francisco Chronicle interview
 2001 Windy City Times interview
 2005 San Francisco Chronicle interview
 Two Cowboy Waltz video
 Queer Music Heritage - Mark Weigle Tribute Section compiled by JD Doyle

1967 births
American country singer-songwriters
American folk singers
American male singer-songwriters
American LGBT singers
Living people
Country musicians from Minnesota
People from Wright County, Minnesota
American gay musicians
LGBT people from Minnesota
Singer-songwriters from Minnesota